Attu Station is a census-designated place (CDP) located on Attu Island in the Aleutians West Census Area in the U.S. state of Alaska. The population was 21 at the 2010 census, consisting entirely of coast guard personnel who resided and worked at Casco Cove Coast Guard Station, but left the island when the station was closed in August 2010, leaving it uninhabited. LORAN Station Attu had provided a navigational signal for mariners of the North Pacific since the 1970s.

History

After the Japanese invasion of Attu Island and the battle to retake it, the United States government constructed a LORAN station on the southern tip of the island, at Theodore Point. Bulldozers were used to cut a road from Baxter Cove to Theodore Point.

In 1960, the station was moved to Casco Cove, near the former United States Navy base at Massacre Bay. Later, it was moved to Massacre Bay. LORAN Station Attu ceased transmission of the LORAN signal on February 8, 2010 and the Russian-American signal ceased on August 1, 2010.

Geography

Demographics

Attu (Naval) Station first appeared on the 1980 U.S. Census as "Attu", a census-designated place (CDP). It did not return on the 1990 census. The name was changed to Attu Naval Station and redesignated a CDP in 2000. It appeared lastly on the 2010 census, just before the closure of the station in August that year and the departure of its remaining residents.

At the 2000 census there were 20 people, 0 households, and 0 families in the CDP. The racial makeup of the CDP was 18 White, 1 from other races, and 1 from two or more races. Five of the population were Hispanic or Latino of any race.
The age distribution was 7 from 18 to 24, 12 from 25 to 44, and 1 from 45 to 64. The median age was 30 years. There were 19 men and one woman.

Males had a median income of $26,250, which is the same as for females.  The per capita income for the CDP was $26,964. None of the population was below the poverty line.

As noted above, however, due to the closure of the station the community is presently uninhabited.

References

External links

 Attu Station at the Community Database Online from the Alaska Division of Community and Regional Affairs
 Maps from the Alaska Department of Labor and Workforce Development: 2000, 2010

Census-designated places in Alaska
Census-designated places in Aleutians West Census Area, Alaska
Census-designated places in Unorganized Borough, Alaska
Populated coastal places in Alaska on the Pacific Ocean
United States Coast Guard Aviation
Road-inaccessible communities of Alaska
Attu Island
Former populated places in Alaska